Central State Historical Archive of Ukraine in Kyiv (CSHAK) is one of the oldest and biggest archives in Ukraine. 

CSHAK contain documents on the history of Ukraine from the 19th century to the founding of the Grand Duchy of Lithuania and the Commonwealth (from the 14th to the end of the 18th century), as well as the Russian Empire (from the first half of the 17th century to the February Revolution of 1917 in Russia). There are also documents on the history of the Hetmanate (the other half of the 17th century to the 18th century). The archive is located at the University of St. Vladimir.

CSHAK contains 2245 funds. Some of the archival funds are presented online.

History 
CSHAK store documents about history of Ukraine since 1369 will 1917. The oldest document is certificate of Russian praepostor Otto from Pilche dated 1369.

Archive was founded in 1852 as Kyiv Central Archive in university of St. Volodymyr. Eventually it received funds from Central Revolution Archive from Kharkiv and Kyiv Oblast Archive.

References

Archives in Ukraine